Nimbus (foaled 1910) was a French Thoroughbred racehorse whose damsire was the 1899 British Triple Crown Champion, Flying Fox. Nimbus was owned and raced by leading French horseman Alexandre Aumont of Haras de Victot in Victot-Pontfol, Calvados.

One of several horses named Nimbus, he is designated as Nimbus "II" in accordance with his birth year. Trained by George Cunnington, Sr. at Chantilly, he was a multiple stakes winner in France.

As a sire, Nimbus notably produced Le Capucin whose wins included the 1923 Prix du Jockey Club and the 1924 Grand International d'Ostende.

References
 Nimbus' pedigree and partial racing stats

1910 racehorse births
Racehorses bred in France
Racehorses trained in France
Thoroughbred family 5-i